Wetheral is a village, civil parish and electoral ward in Cumbria, England. At the 2001 census, the population of the Wetheral Ward was 4,039,  The civil parish of Wetheral is slightly larger, with a population of 5,203. being counted as 4,541 at the 2011 Census for both Parish and Ward.

Wetheral stands high on a bank overlooking a gorge in the River Eden.  Parts of the riverbank here are surrounded by ancient woodlands, including Wetheral Woods, owned by the National Trust.  Formerly a small ferryboat operated to the village of Great Corby on the opposite bank, and an iron ring can still be found attached to the rocks on the Great Corby side of the river where the ferry would tie up.

The place-name 'Wetheral' is first attested in the Register of  Wetheral Priory circa 1100 AD, where it appears as Wetherhala. The name means 'the haugh (area of flat land by a river) where wethers (castrated male sheep) were kept'.

The Newcastle to Carlisle Railway has a station here at the west end of Corby Bridge (popularly known as 'Wetheral Viaduct') over the Eden which acts also as a footbridge connecting with Great Corby. The station was closed during the Beeching cuts in 1967, but was reopened in 1981. In 1836 one of the very earliest railway accidents happened close to Wetheral station.

In the Middle Ages there was a priory at Wetheral. All that is left now is the gatehouse, which is in the care of English Heritage, and some low ruined walls behind the farm buildings that now occupy the site.

At the historic core of the village lies the village green, in one corner of which stands Wetheral Cross. The cross previously stood in the centre of the green before it was moved. The green is surrounded by large period houses in different styles, and the Fantails restaurant, shop and tea room front the green. The church, hotel (The Crown), village hall, hairdresser and pub (The Wheatsheaf) are not far away. The north western part of the village is known as Wetheral Plain and consists of a ribbon development along Plains Road and the housing estates of Greenacres and Faustin Hill.

Wetheral Parish Church is dedicated to the Holy Trinity and St Constantine. St Constantine was said to be a Scottish king who relinquished his throne to become a monk. Legend has it that he lived as a hermit in a cave at Wetheral., which can be reached by walking down the River Eden.  The current Rector is based at The Rectory in Warwick Bridge. The Church contains a life-size sculpture by Joseph Nollekens of 'Faith'. This was commissioned by Henry Howard after the death, in childbirth, of his wife Maria. The cost of the sculpture was £1,500 in the late eighteenth century, which is estimated to be equivalent to nearly £2 million today.

There is no school in the village (it closed many years ago) and most primary school children travel to the school at Scotby, although some go to Great Corby or Warwick Bridge. The village lies in the catchment area of the Richard Rose Central Academy in Carlisle, although the William Howard School in nearby Brampton provides a bus service for pupils who wish to attend school there. This is undertaken by most pupils despite having to pay a fee for the service rather than using the free bus to the catchment school.

World war one ambulance driver and nurse Pat Waddell was born near here at Warwick Bridge and Nursing education theorist Nancy Roper was born in Wetheral in 1918. She trained in Cumberland Infirmary, Carlisle, and went on to develop the nursing process based on Activities of Daily Living (Roper -Logan - Tierney method) used across the UK and beyond.

The ward of Wetheral includes the villages and hamlets of Warwick-on-Eden, Aglionby, Scotby, Cotehill, Cumwhinton, Wetheral Shield and Wetheral Pasture.  The civil parish also includes part of the Great Corby & Geltsdale ward, namely the villages of Great Corby, and Warwick Bridge (but not Corby Hill or Little Corby).

At Wetheral Shield is the Animals' Refuge, operated by the National Equine (and Smaller Animals) Defence League.

See also

Listed buildings in Wetheral

References

External links
 Cumbria County History Trust: Wetheral (nb: provisional research only – see Talk page)
Animals' Refuge

 
Villages in Cumbria
Civil parishes in Cumbria
City of Carlisle